Multangular bone may refer to:

 Trapezium, also known as the greater multangular bone
 Trapezoid bone, also known as the lesser multangular bone